Jean Gray may refer to:

 Jean Vivra Gray (1924–2016), Australian television and film actress
 Jean Grey, a fictional superhero
 Jean Grae, American hip hop recording artist
 Jean Gray (b. 1942),  Canadian academic and physician